Kelly Kolasco Fraga (born October 3, 1974 in Belo Horizonte) is a volleyball player who competed for Brazil at the 2000 Summer Olympics in Sydney, Australia. There she won the bronze medal with the Women's National Team.

References
 UOL profile

1974 births
Living people
Brazilian women's volleyball players
Volleyball players at the 2000 Summer Olympics
Olympic volleyball players of Brazil
Olympic bronze medalists for Brazil
Sportspeople from Belo Horizonte
Olympic medalists in volleyball
Medalists at the 2000 Summer Olympics